Jiles is both a surname and a given name. Notable people with the name include:

 David Jiles, British engineer and academic who researched the Jiles-Atherton model of magnetic hysteresis
 Dwayne Jiles (born 1961), former professional American football player 
 Pamela Jiles (born 1954), American sprinter
 Pamela Jiles (born 1960), Chilean journalist and politician
 Paulette Jiles (born 1943), Canadian writer
 Jiles Perry Richardson, Jr. (1930–1959), American musician better known as The Big Bopper

See also
 Giles (disambiguation)